The 1988–89 Primeira Divisão was the 55th season of top-tier football in Portugal.

Overview
It was contested by 20 teams, and S.L. Benfica won the championship.

League standings

Results

Season statistics

Top goalscorers

References

External links
 Portugal 1988-89 - RSSSF (Jorge Miguel Teixeira)
 Portuguese League 1988/89 - footballzz.co.uk
 Portugal - Table of Honor - Soccer Library 

Primeira Liga seasons
Port
1988–89 in Portuguese football